Sandbakken may refer to:

Places
Sandbakken, Sarpsborg, a borough in the city of Sarpsborg, Norway
Sandbakken, Troms, a village in Lenvik municipality, Norway
Sandbakken Chapel, a chapel in Lenvik municipality, Norway
Sandbakken Moraine, a moraine in Queen Maud Land, Antarctica

People
Dag Henrik Sandbakken, a Norwegian politician for the Centre Party

Herleif Sandbakken, a Norwegian Air Force Lt Colonel and aviator.